Michael Neumayer (born 15 January 1979) is a German former ski jumper who competed from 2000 to 2015. He won a silver medal in the team normal hill at the 2005 FIS Nordic World Ski Championships in Oberstdorf and finished 32nd in the individual normal hill at those same championships.

Neumayer also won a bronze in the team event at the FIS Ski-Flying World Championships 2006. His best individual finish at the Winter Olympics was 8th in the individual normal hill at Turin in 2006.

Neumayer has five individual career victories from 2002 to 2008 (albeit none of them in an individual World Cup competition). He is an employee at a tax consultancy firm away from his ski jumping duties.

World Cup victories
Team

References
  
 

1979 births
German male ski jumpers
Living people
Olympic ski jumpers of Germany
People from Bad Reichenhall
Sportspeople from Upper Bavaria
Ski jumpers at the 2006 Winter Olympics
Ski jumpers at the 2010 Winter Olympics
Olympic silver medalists for Germany
Olympic medalists in ski jumping
FIS Nordic World Ski Championships medalists in ski jumping
Medalists at the 2010 Winter Olympics